Fabiane Tesche Niclotti (6 October 1984 – 28 June 2016) was a Brazilian model. She was also a Law student and a business manager of a store.

On 15 April 2004, she was elected Miss Brasil, representing Rio Grande do Sul, a state with a tradition of many Miss Brazil winners. During her time contesting Miss Universe, she was seen as very beautiful, content, and friendly. She studied English in Exeter, with the money she received from winning Miss Brazil. She studied social science at Universidade Federal do Rio Grande do Sul.

She was found dead on the evening of 28 June 2016, at her apartment in Gramado. The cause of her death remains unknown.

References 

1984 births
2016 deaths
Brazilian female models
Brazilian people of Italian descent
Miss Brazil winners
Miss Universe 2004 contestants
People from Rio Grande do Sul
Federal University of Rio Grande do Sul alumni